Ashley Romans (born December 28, 1992) is an American actress, known for playing Agent 355 in Y: The Last Man, Hermione Granger in Hermione Granger and the Quarter Life Crisis, and Tabitha Hutter on NOS4A2.

Early life 
Romans was originally inspired to pursue acting while watching her older sister play Ruth in her high school production of A Raisin in the Sun. She studied theater at Pace University, graduating in 2015.

Career 
In 2017, she won the Los Angeles Drama Critics Circle Award for Lead Performance in the play Rotterdam, in which she plays a character undergoing gender transition in conjunction with a partner who is struggling with coming out to her parents as a lesbian. In 2020, Romans replaced Lashana Lynch in the lead role of Agent 355 in the television adaptation of the comic book series Y: The Last Man. The series premiered in 2021.

Filmography

Film

Television

References

External links

1992 births
Living people
African-American actresses
American television actresses
21st-century American actresses
Pace University alumni